The men's triple jump event at the 2015 European Athletics U23 Championships was held in Tallinn, Estonia, at Kadriorg Stadium on 11 and 12 July.

Medalists

Results

Final
12 July

Qualifications
11 July

Participation
According to an unofficial count, 20 athletes from 14 countries participated in the event.

References

Triple jump
Triple jump at the European Athletics U23 Championships